The Real Quiet Stakes is an American Thoroughbred horse race run annually at Hollywood Park Racetrack in Inglewood, California. Open to two-year-olds, the stakes race is contested over a distance of 1 1/16 miles (8.5 furlongs) on Cushion Track synthetic dirt. Run in mid November, the race offers a purse of $100,000 Added.

Inaugurated in 2005, the race is named in honor of Real Quiet, the 1998 American Champion Three-Year-Old Male Horse and winner of that year's Kentucky Derby and Preakness Stakes. In 1999, Real Quiet won the Hollywood Gold Cup at Hollywood Park Racetrack.

Records
Speed  record:
1:42.25 - Chocolate Candy (2008)

Winners

References
 The Real Quiet Stakes at Pedigree Query

Horse races in California
Hollywood Park Racetrack
Listed stakes races in the United States
Flat horse races for two-year-olds
Recurring events established in 2005